Habronematoidea is a superfamily of spirurian nematodes in the large order Spirurida. Like all nematodes, they have neither a circulatory nor a respiratory system.

Though none of the families placed here are overly diverse, they are quite large except for the monotypic Hedruridae. Consequently, the Habronematoidea are at present the second-largest superfamily of Spirurida, after the Filarioidea which contains the massively speciose Onchocercidae.

The families of the Habronematoidea are:
 Cystidicolidae
 Habronematidae
 Hedruridae
 Tetrameridae

References 

Spirurida
Animal superfamilies